Knowledge and Human Development Authority (KHDA) is the educational quality assurance and regulatory authority of the Government of Dubai, United Arab Emirates which is responsible for evaluation and accreditation of higher educational institutions and universities in the Emirate of Dubai. Established in 2006 by the country's Vice President and Prime Minister Sheikh Mohammed bin Rashid al-Maktoum, it is the main body that oversees the growth of private education sector in the emirate, including early childhood education centers and schools. 

KHDA oversees the private education sector in Dubai, higher education providers, and training institutes. KHDA is responsible for the growth and quality of private education in Dubai.

Between 2008 and 2018, the number of students attending schools rated good or better has more than doubled - from 30% in 2008/09 to 66% in the 2017/18 academic year. Likewise the number of Emirati students attending schools rated good or better has increased significantly, from 26% in 2008/09, to 62% in 2017/18.

KHDA's current priorities focus on increasing the number of expatriate and Emirati students attending high-quality schools, and to integrate wellbeing into the concepts and processes that define education in Dubai. It works with its local education community as well as international partners to promote positive education within all schools and universities in Dubai. KHDA believes the purpose of education is to prepare students for the tests of life, not just a life of tests. Positive education practices promote essential life skills and personal attributes alongside academic achievement. Qualities such as resilience, creativity, optimism, collaboration and empathy are recognised as essential for students to have in order to lead meaningful lives that will enable them to flourish.

Areas of Authority

Early Childhood Education Centres
Early childhood centers or nurseries should follow certain guidelines set by the local Ministry of Social Affairs. There are over 120 child care centers registered in Dubai. KHDA offers a method to help parents how to choose a nursery wisely. In KHDA's webpage, there are three steps that parents should consider when choosing a nursery. Firstly, the curriculum and learning approach of the center, whether it be through the languages spoken or the methods used to teach the children. Secondly, the quality of provision, and that comes within caring and nurturing the child. Lastly, the environment, as to how many people are monitoring the children and making sure they are safe.

Schools

The Dubai Schools Inspection Bureau (DSIB), a part of the KHDA, is a group of inspectors who assess the schools in Dubai, United Arab Emirates. Inspectors use a six-point scale to express their judgements. The four levels on the scale are defined as follows:

 Outstanding - Exceptionally high quality of performance or practice.
 Very Good - The expected level for every school in Dubai.
 Good - The minimum level of acceptability required for Dubai. All key aspects of performance and practice in every school should meet or exceed this level.
 Weak - Quality not yet at the level acceptable for schools in Dubai. Schools will be expected to take urgent measures to improve the quality of any aspect of their performance or practice that is judged at this level.
 Very Weak - the measures to protect and safeguard students are not founded.
What are schools assessed on?

DSIB Ratings
KHDA publishes the rating of each inspected school in Dubai on its website and in the Dubai School Inspections Bureau (DSIB) Annual Report. The DSIB annual report is released each September. A detailed report on each inspected school is also available online.

Additional Inspection Focus Areas

Other inspection areas include assessing the Inclusive Education as well as attaining the school's curriculum. The Inclusive Education part of the School Inspection Supplement has been initiated to abide by Dubai's 2020 vision to become on the most inclusive cities. Moreover, students of SEND (special educational needs and disabilities) or students of determination should be accompanied by a Learning Support Assistants (LSAs) whom will be assessed according to their implementation of Strategic Inclusive Education Plan. 
Additionally, Moral Education was announced by Sheikh Mohammed bin Zayed to be part of school curricula in the UAE. Moral Education is formed by four pillars, 
 character and morality
 the individual and the community
 cultural studies
 civic studies. 
KHDA will be assessing the school's Moral Education's provision with the curriculum, teaching style, and parents. Moral Education is entitled with UAE's moral values which seeks to help in the student's personal development and growth. It is to emphasize on the importance of students' behavior to ensure affective domains.

School Parent Contract

KHDA launched a new legally binding initiative outlining the rights and responsibilities of both parents and schools in June 2013. The first schools to introduce the contracts at the start of the 2013/2014 academic year will be Dubai Modern Education School, Al Ittihad Private School – Al Mamzar, Al Ittihad Private School – Jumeirah, School of Modern Skills, Greenwood International School and American Academy in Al Mizhar.

Report

Higher Education / Universities 
Dubai has encouraged the establishment of international university branch campuses (HEP Branches), whose home-base campuses (HEP Home) are located outside the country, to provide high quality international degrees to its citizens and expatriate residents. HEP Branches are located across several Free Zones which allow 100% foreign ownership in tax-free environments.
Clarification of the different types of HEPs operating in Dubai, is necessary to understand the higher education landscape. HEPs in Dubai can be located either in- or outside a Free Zone. Three main types of HEPs operate in the Emirate: HEP Branch, HEP Local and HEP Federal.

Training Institutions
With more than 800 approved training institutes offering a broad range of courses – from foreign languages and computer training to engineering, banking and finance – Dubai is an important regional destination for professional development. KHDA aims to support the delivery of high quality technical and vocational education and training, thus meeting the needs of residents and employers in Dubai. Training institutes that already have Educational Services Permits from KHDA can access the e-Services page for renewal and amendments to their permits.

KHDA Initiatives

What Works

What Works is a unique initiative to help transform Dubai's private education sector through collaboration. With the support of private schools in Dubai and local community partners, What Works was initiated in September 2012. Based on the principles of Appreciative Inquiry, What Works is a unique programme for teachers and school leaders in Dubai's private education sector, designed to increase collaboration within the sector and improve student outcomes. Centred on six events taking place each academic year, What Works brings together subject teachers, heads and principals to share what they do best at their schools.

A central tenet of What Works is that it relies on local expertise to strengthen the overall quality of education in Dubai. During each What Works event, teachers participate in workshops given by their colleagues at other schools. What Works also promotes a culture of collaboration between schools throughout the year.  In its Head to Head programme, principals and subject heads visit on another's schools to share best practices.  This is a particularly unique innovation given Dubai's private schools landscape, which includes schools teaching 15 different curricula. Quite often, the learning exchanges involve schools offering different curricula.

Abundance
In 2016, the KHDA the Abundance Group project, which invited high-achieving schools in Dubai to share their learning with others to help improve the quality of all schools in Dubai. 
Schools rated Very Good or Good during annual inspections were offered the option of a differentiated inspection based on self-evaluation, allowing them to focus their resources on giving back to other schools. Sixteen Outstanding-rated schools participated in the project, offering workshops and training for teachers and senior leaders from schools rated Acceptable or lower during the project's first year, with partnerships continuing since.

Dubai Student Wellbeing Census
Dubai's vision to be one of the happiest cities in the world by 2021 has pushed forward KHDA to investigate students’ satisfaction. KHDA has partnered with the Department of Education and Child Development of South Australia to deliver a five-year project to measure students’ wellbeing. It was first conducted in November 2017, asking around 65,000 students across 168 schools about their happiness, relationships, lifestyle, among other questions. The results of the Census said that the three main contributing factors to a student's wellbeing is a good breakfast, good night's sleep, and good relationships with adults. Furthermore, according to the data:

 	84% of students are happy most of the time 
 	77% of students feel safe at school 
 	76% of students enjoy close friendships

Report

Lighthouse

KHDA's strategy to improve the quality of education starts with the principals. The formation of Lighthouse is to provide a platform for principals to share ideas with one another that will help in the development of all schools in Dubai. Each year, there is a theme that is discussed among the school leaders. An example would be of this year's theme: proposing a research explaining different methods to enhance students’ wellbeing.

Living Arabic
Launched in October 2015, Living Arabic is a programme organised by Arabic teachers in Dubai, for teachers in Dubai. It shares the best of what language teachers are doing to inspire the love of Arabic in their students, and helps inspire other Arabic teachers to deliver lessons that harmonize with how students want to learn. The events are open to existing Arabic teachers, and all other teachers interested in incorporating Arabic into their lessons.

Teachers of Dubai
Inspired by Humans of New York, Teachers of Dubai was established in 2015 on social media platforms to appreciate the effort of teachers. Through that, they are given a chance to share their stories online. It has left a positive impact on all those who shared their stories and helped strengthen the connection teachers have with their students.

IPEN in Dubai
KHDA's partnership with International Positive Education Network is to encourage improvement in not only academics but also character building. KHDA was invited to showcase private school sector in the Festival of Positive Education. KHDA's team along with “Happiness Ambassadors” (school teachers), traveled to Dallas to attend festival. The festival brought together educational providers and psychologists to help foster positive education in schools all around the world. KHDA hopes to build upon the integration of positive education in schools as it will induce a happy outcome for students, teachers, and parents with https://www.khda.gov.ae/en/ipen.

Dubai Saturday Clubs and Hatta Wellbeing Camp 
The initiation of Dubai Saturday Clubs is inspired by Sorrell's Foundation National Saturday Club. KHDA offered a programme along with social entrepreneurs especially to enhance students’ wellbeing by creating meaningful community projects. It has brought together students of different schools to work with one another and promoted meaningful skills. KHDA concentrates on students’ wellbeing as much as it does on their perseverance of the highest quality of education. The Hatta Wellbeing Camp is an overnight excursion for students’ of different schools. It offers an exceptional time for students to reconnect with nature through physical activities.

Rahhal
Rahhal is part of 10x – a Dubai Future Foundation initiative to take Dubai ten years into the future – in just two years. Meaning traveller in Arabic, the message of Rahhal is simple: the world is a classroom, and all learning counts. Rahhal is a fully customisable platform that will help turn anyone, and any organisation, into a learning provider, and turn all Dubai residents into lifelong learners.  It will be a conduit that harnesses the community's knowledge and skills and channels it to each individual learner. All learning on the platform will be given the stamp of approval by Dubai government. Rahhal provides a creative and innovative alternative to mainstream education – an alternative that brings out the best from within the community and recognises learning wherever it occurs. It is a platform that helps to integrate learning with life, and life with learning.

By providing a supportive regulatory environment, Rahhal will enhance learning opportunities for all members of the community, whether they're children or adults. It will support learners with special education needs as well as those with special gifts and talents; it will diversify the choices for parents who wish to supplement their children's education; and it will provide adults with a flexible, modular form of learning that can be used to further their careers or enrich their lives. KHDA is currently working with parents, schools, government bodies and private organisations to bring Rahhal to life, united by a grand vision and a common purpose. Rahhal is currently in pilot phase and will be made available to a greater number of learners in the months.

KHDA Work Environment

5 Ways of Wellbeing
In 2014, KHDA implemented the evidence-based '5 Ways to Wellbeing' - developed by Nic Marks at the New Economics Foundation - into its processes and physical environment. These '5 Ways' - Keep Learning, Give, Take Notice, Connect, and Be Active positive changes at the workplace. To motivate the employees to "Keep Learning", KHDA has opened up a library to promote reading. It has also hosted talks from national and international speakers, and funded training programs for employees to attend of their choice. KHDA's encouragement to 'Give by participating in charitable activities throughout the community – at hospitals, at special needs centres, at mosques and at animal rescue centres - and by making more time to help each other during the working day. KHDA established a programme with an orphanage in Banda Aceh, Indonesia which enabled teams to travel and spend a week working with the children and their carers. These trips were funded partly by KHDA, and partly by fundraising activities we held throughout the year. KHDA implemented ‘Take Notice’ by beginning the meetings with mindfulness exercises and by practicing an ‘attitude of gratitude’.

KHDA's office environment, meanwhile, made it easier to ‘Connect’, by replacing standard-issue carpets and cubicles with sofas, mobile desks, bean bags and green spaces. KHDA established a ‘no-door’ policy instead of an 'open door' policy, with communal areas taking the place of private offices. In the KHDA lobby, people mingle freely and have conversations over coffee, often entertained by someone playing on the baby grand piano, or by lovebirds tweeting as customers arrive. At KHDA, Dr. Abdulla Al Karam believes that guests should be indistinguishable from employees; board members are no different from new joiners. To facilitate ‘Be Active’ KHDA integrated a fully functioning gym into the workspace. A 300-metre running track around the perimeter of the office served as the warm-up for daily fitness sessions before and after work. A boxing ring helped employees release stress, while a yoga room with daily classes helped to channel it more positively. KHDA regularly began participating in races and obstacle races such as the Desert Warrior Challenge and the Spartan Race. Our first participation in this type of event included a team of 10 colleagues – all committed to exercise and fitness.  

KHDA's working practices, too, nurtured greater happiness in the people. Mothers with young children were able to spend less time at work and more time at home; an on-site nursery allowed parents to stay near their children while they were at the office; flexible hours and working from home were options available to our team, depending on the type of work they did.

Self-management 
It has been reported that KHDA is managed in a style suggested by Holacracy, which eschews typical management hierarchies, and is touted as a fluid organisational system that integrates employees of different departments to work with another for progress, autonomy, and self-development.

References

External links 
 
 
 KHDA Publications

Organizations established in 2006
Organisations based in Dubai
Education in Dubai
Government agencies of Dubai